West Lanyon Quoit, also known as Lower Lanyon Quoit, is the remains of a prehistoric dolmen situated in the parish of Madron in Cornwall . It was excavated in the late 18th century, and much of the structure has since been destroyed.

Location
West Lanyon Quoit is located northwest of Penzance near the road between Madron and Morvah. It stands 300 metres to the southwest of the road. 700 metres to the east stands the much more famous Lanyon Quoit.

Description
At the present day all that can be seen of West Lanyon Quoit are two large stones. One support stone (probably the southwest stone of the chamber) is still standing: it is 1.6 metres high and 1.5 metres wide. The capstone, which rests against it, is 4.1 metres long and 2.6 metres wide.

Discovery and excavation
West Lanyon Quoit was originally covered by a large barrow mound. The burial chamber only came to light in the late 18th century. The account of the discovery was published in volume 14 of Archaeologia in 1803. This describes how the landowner had directed his servants to remove the earth from the barrow for compost. When the servants had removed "near a hundred cart-loads" they discovered "the supporters of a cromlech, from which the coverstone was slipped off on the fourth side, but still leaning against them." The chamber was orientated north-east to south-west: the northeast end was open. The chamber was rectangular and its measurements were given as 10 feet by 5 feet by 5 feet. Digging into the chamber led to the discovery of a broken urn, ashes, and some human bones. Given that the chamber was full of mound material, it is now thought that the tomb had been opened previously and that the urn and bones were a secondary, probably Bronze Age, cremation burial.

References

Penwith
Dolmens in Cornwall